= Lanes Pond =

Swamp in Georgia, United States

Coordinates: 30°43′27″N 83°21′18″W

Lanes Pond is a swamp in the U.S. state of Georgia.

The pond was named after Mills B. Lane III, the original owner of the site. A variant name is "Lane Pond".
